Peter Ablinger (born 15 March 1959) is an Austrian composer.

Ablinger was born in 1959 in Schwanenstadt in Upper Austria. He attended the graphic HTL Linz and studied jazz piano from 1977 to 1982 in Graz. He also studied composition with Gösta Neuwirth in Graz and Roman Haubenstock-Ramati in Vienna. Since 1982 he has lived in Berlin.

Ablinger focused on chamber music ensembles to 1994, after which he was also involved in electro-acoustics and sound installation. Since 1980 he is working on plant complex "White / Whitish," which deals with various aspects of the white noise, and proved to be very use of different media: instruments, installations, objects, electro-acoustic pieces, note plays, prose, plays, music without sound ; total of 36 parts. In 2005 he was said to have put on a "unique opera project" in Graz. Since 1993 he has been a visiting professor at several universities in Graz, Darmstadt, Hamburg and Prague.

In May 2012 Ablinger was appointed as a new member of the Academy of Arts, Berlin, he accepted his election. An active membership requires that artists participate actively in the tasks of the Academy, so it will show in the future continued presence in the academy.

Writings

References

External links
 
 Composer's entry on IRCAM's database

1959 births
Living people
People from Schwanenstadt
Austrian male composers
Austrian composers
Members of the Academy of Arts, Berlin